The 1958 Canadian federal election was held to elect members  of the House of Commons of Canada of the 24th Parliament of Canada on March 31, 1958, just nine months after the 23rd election. It transformed Prime Minister John Diefenbaker's minority into the largest majority government in Canadian history and the second largest percentage of the popular vote. Although the Tories would surpass their 1958 seat total in the 1984 election, the 1958 result (achieved in a smaller House) remains unmatched both in terms of percentage of seats (78.5%) and the size of the Government majority over all opposition parties (a 151-seat majority).  Voter turnout was 79.4%.

Overview

Diefenbaker called a snap election and capitalized on three factors:
 Nationally, the Liberals had just chosen a new leader, Lester Pearson, who had given an ill-advised maiden speech in Commons that asked Diefenbaker to resign and recommend the Governor General allow the Liberals to form a government without an election due to the recent economic downturn. Diefenbaker seized on the remark by describing a series of classified Liberal Cabinet documents stating that the economy would face a downturn in that year. This contrasted heavily with the Liberals' 1957 campaign promises.
 A turnaround in Quebec: Quebec had been largely Liberal since the Conscription Crisis of 1917, but upon the resignation of former Prime Minister Louis St. Laurent, the province had no favourite son leader, as they had since 1948, and its voters were open to new options. Seeking a greater voice in Ottawa, Quebec Premier Maurice Duplessis's Union Nationale used their party machine to ally with the Tories, allowing Diefenbaker's Progressive Conservatives to win two thirds of the seats in what had been a Liberal stronghold for a generation. While the Liberals finished only four percentage points behind the Tories in Quebec, much of their vote was wasted racking up large majorities in their traditional safest seats. Nevertheless, the 25 seats the Liberals won in Quebec accounted for more than half of their decimated caucus, and on a proportional basis was their best performance after Newfoundland.
 A collapse in support for the Social Credit Party which lost all 19 of its seats. It did take half the votes it had taken in 1957 but suffered seat wipe-out anyway, due to the non-proportional First-past-the-post voting system in use. Prior to the 1957 election, the Socreds were seen as a credible threat to replace the Tories as the main right wing party in the country, as they had done in British Columbia and Alberta, but the popularity of the Diefenbaker government persuaded many Social Credit supporters to abandon their party.  This allowed the Tories to pick up not only Social Credit seats, but also proved decisive in many seats that featured a fractured vote between the PCs, Social Credit, Liberals, and CCF.  Notably, the Tories swept all seventeen seats in Alberta, where they had previously held just three seats to Social Credit's thirteen (and Liberal one seat).  The election proved to be the start of a long decline for the federal Social Credit Party. It would never seriously challenge the PCs dominance again in federal politics (even in the West), although the BC Social Credit Party governed that province for all but three years until 1991.

National results 

Notes:

"Previous" refers to standings at previous election, not to standings in the House of Commons at dissolution.

* The party did not nominate candidates in the previous election.

x - less than 0.005% of the popular vote

Results by province

xx - less than 0.05% of the popular vote

See also

 List of Canadian federal general elections
 List of political parties in Canada
 24th Canadian Parliament

References

Further reading

External links
 The Elections of 1957 and 1958, by P.E. Bryden
 Electoral Results by Party, on Parliament of Canada site 

1958
 Federal
Canadian federal election